Tenacious D Live is the first live album by American rock band Tenacious D. Produced by John Spiker, it was released as a worldwide vinyl on November 27, 2015 by Columbia Records and was released on digital platforms on January 15, 2016. The release features recordings from the band's 2012 Rize of the Fenix tour and their 2013 European tour. The album features five songs from the bands debut album, five songs from their Rize of the Fenix album and one song from their The Pick of Destiny album.

Track listing
All tracks written by Jack Black and Kyle Gass, except where noted.

Personnel
Jack Black – vocals, acoustic guitar 
Kyle Gass – acoustic guitar, backing vocals 
John Konesky – electric guitar
John Spiker – bass, piano 
Brooks Wackerman – drums (2012 recordings)
Scott Seiver – drums (2013 recordings)

References

Tenacious D albums
Columbia Records albums